Henadz Maroz (tr. Gennadiy Viktorovich Moroz; born August 15, 1978) is a retired Belarusian high jumper.

In 2003 he equalled his indoor personal best of 2.30 metres to win the bronze medal at the World Indoor Championships. His outdoor personal best of 2.33 metres was set in July 2001 in Brest.

Maroz won silver medals at the Universiade in 2001 and 2005. He has competed in other major competitions like the 2004 Summer Olympics and the 2005 World Championships without success.

Competition record

References
 
 Gennadiy Moroz

1978 births
Living people
Belarusian male high jumpers
Olympic male high jumpers
Olympic athletes of Belarus
Athletes (track and field) at the 2004 Summer Olympics
Universiade medalists in athletics (track and field)
Universiade silver medalists for Belarus